Xenia Hill is the rocky hill rising to 96 m in the northeast extremity of Half Moon Island in the South Shetland Islands, Antarctica.  It surmounts McFarlane Strait to the north and east, and Menguante Cove to the south-southeast.  The area was visited by early 19th century sealers operating from nearby Yankee Harbour.

The feature's name appeared in a 2000 publication following Argentine ornithological research on the island, and in the 2005 and 2009 Bulgarian maps of Livingston Island.

Location

Maps
 L.L. Ivanov et al. Antarctica: Livingston Island and Greenwich Island, South Shetland Islands. Scale 1:100000 topographic map. Sofia: Antarctic Place-names Commission of Bulgaria, 2005.
 L.L. Ivanov. Antarctica: Livingston Island and Greenwich, Robert, Snow and Smith Islands. Scale 1:120000 topographic map.  Troyan: Manfred Wörner Foundation, 2009.  
 Antarctic Digital Database (ADD). Scale 1:250000 topographic map of Antarctica. Scientific Committee on Antarctic Research (SCAR). Since 1993, regularly updated.
 L.L. Ivanov. Antarctica: Livingston Island and Smith Island. Scale 1:100000 topographic map. Manfred Wörner Foundation, 2017.

References
 Cesar Garcia Esponda, Nestor Coria & Diego Montalti. Breeding birds at Half Moon Island, South Shetland Islands, Antarctica, 1995/96. Marine Ornithology, 2000, 28, pp. 59–62.

Hills of the South Shetland Islands